Krisnapur is a Bangladeshi village situated in Chakaria Upazila. According to the 2011 Bangladesh census, Krisnapur had 273 households and a population of 1,139.

Education 
 Krisnapur Govt. Primary School

References 

Populated places in Bangladesh
Chakaria Upazila
Villages in Bangladesh by district